The Blue Line is a rapid transit line in the Greater Boston metropolitan area, one of four rapid transit lines operated by the Massachusetts Bay Transportation Authority (MBTA). It runs from Bowdoin station in downtown Boston under Boston Harbor to East Boston and Revere on the inner North Shore, where it terminates at Wonderland. The stop at Airport Station, by way of a free shuttle bus, is one of two rapid transit connections to Logan International Airport. In 1967, during a systemwide rebranding, the line was assigned the blue color because it passes under the Boston Harbor. With an end-to-end travel time of less than twenty minutes, the Blue Line is the shortest of Boston's heavy-rail lines and the only line to have both third rail and overhead catenary sections.

The East Boston Tunnel was built as a streetcar tunnel in 1904 with Howard A. Carson as chief engineer; after an extension to Bowdoin in 1916, it was converted to heavy rail metro rolling stock in 1924. In 1952 and 1954 the line was extended along the former route of the Boston, Revere Beach and Lynn Railroad, in a project intended to reach Lynn but ultimately cut short to Wonderland. Further extensions to Lynn and Charles/MGH downtown are long-planned but not yet funded. From approximately 1998–2011, the MBTA made most Blue Line stations fully accessible as part of a larger effort to accommodate 6-car trains on the line. , the only station in service on the Blue Line which is not fully accessible is the downtown Boston terminus Bowdoin.

History

East Boston Tunnel

The East Boston Tunnel under Boston Harbor was the first North American subway tunnel to run beneath a body of water when it opened in 1904, and the second underwater vehicular tunnel of significant length built in the United States. The tunnel was constructed using a modified version of the Greathead Shield;  of the  tunnel is actually under water. The excavation took two-and-a-half years, and cost $3 million and the lives of four workmen.

Initially used as a streetcar tunnel, it ran from Maverick Square in East Boston to downtown Boston's Court Street station, with an intermediate stop at Devonshire (now State). Court Street had pedestrian access to Scollay Square station (now Government Center) but transfers to the East Boston Tunnel required an additional fare of 1 cent. In 1906, Atlantic Station (now Aquarium) was opened, with a connection to the Atlantic Avenue Elevated. Court Street proved to be a problematic terminus as its single-track design limited frequent service.

Bowdoin extension

The Boston Elevated Railway (BERy) began an extension towards Beacon Hill in 1912. This downtown extension was opened to Bowdoin, with an intermediate stop at Scollay Under (now Government Center), on March 18, 1916. Immediately west of the new Bowdoin station platforms, a tight turnaround loop track underground allowed trains to quickly reverse direction for the return trip. The project also included a new portal at Joy Street, which was used by a Central Square–Orient Heights line. The total cost of the extension was $2.3 million.

Metro conversion
The East Boston Tunnel was originally planned to be operated with high-floor metro rolling stock and connected to the then-planned Cambridge Elevated line. When that plan was dropped in 1903 due to a disagreement between the Boston Transit Commission and the BERy, the stations were built with low platforms. Large bi-loading streetcars (with high floors but capable of loading from low platforms), which incorporated many attributes from metro cars used on the Main Line Elevated, began use in 1905. However, neither these nor the large center-entrance cars introduced in 1917 (which were designed for multiple unit operation) could fully handle the crowds.

In 1921, the Boston Transit Department (BTD)—the successor to the BTC—began work at Maverick Square to convert the East Boston Tunnel to high-floor metro trains. The next year, the BTD board approved the construction of high-level platforms at the four downtown stations. The Maverick Square incline was replaced with Maverick station, which provided cross-platform transfers between tunnel trains and surface streetcars.

Over the weekend of April 18–21, 1924, the East Boston Tunnel was converted to use the new high-floor trains. The tightly staged changeover required 1500 men to complete. Temporary wooden platform sections were put in place to allow service to begin on April 21, with the permanent concrete sections completed over the following months. The edges of the original low platforms can still be seen under the high platforms at State and Aquarium. Rather than modify the narrow tunnel, the BERy elected to replace the streetcars with brand-new smaller-than-usual high-platform rapid transit cars which could operate in tight clearances—particularly around the tight loop at Bowdoin.

Revere extension

From 1952 to 1954, a surface-level extension was constructed along the recently-defunct Boston, Revere Beach and Lynn Railroad, from Maverick to the current terminus at Wonderland. The original trackage had been narrow gauge, but was converted to standard gauge for this Revere Extension of the subway. The first above-ground station on the new extension served Boston's Logan Airport, and was the first American urban transit connection to a commercial airfield. Beyond Maverick, the power feed was changed from third rail to overhead catenary (both at 600 V DC) to reduce the risk of winter ice buildup due to proximity to the ocean.

The line was officially renamed the East Boston Tunnel & Revere Extension by the MTA in 1952, and designated as "Route 3" on system maps. It was renamed as the Blue Line on August 26, 1965, as part of the new MBTA's color-based rebranding. The color blue represented water, as the line passes under Boston Harbor and travels near the coast for much of its length. Until the Silver Line was extended to Logan in 2004–05, the Blue Line was the primary rapid transit connection to the airport.

On April 21, 2018, the SL3 Silver Line service to Chelsea opened with a connection to the Blue Line at Airport station, providing transfer service to Chelsea, the Seaport District and South Station.

Station renovations 

Unlike the Red Line and Orange Line, which had substantial new sections and station renovations in the 1970s and 1980s, most of the Blue Line had not been substantially modified since 1954. In 1988, the MBTA began planning for accessibility modifications as well as platform extensions to accommodate 6-car trains - similar to what had been done on the Orange and Red lines. The project was then expected to be complete in 1994. In 1989, the MBTA awarded design contracts for modernization and platform lengthening (to accommodate six-car trains) at nine Blue Line stations. Final design on a number of the modifications - the Blue Line Modernization Project - began in 1990–92.

A simultaneous $8 million noise reduction program added sound walls at Beachmont and Orient Heights, rubber mats under tracks, and soundproofing of nearby homes. The stations reopened on June 26, 1995. Unlike the other stations, Wood Island was not accessible after the 1994-95 renovation; elevators were not added until 2000.

 was closed from October 14, 2000, until October 29, 2001, for renovations, which were completed in 2003. A relocated  station opened on June 3, 2004. Sequential closures of Wonderland, Wood Island, Revere Beach, and Beachmont stations took place in June through November 2008 for platform repairs.

Reconstruction of  began on October 4, 2005. The project was sufficiently progressed for six-car trains to enter service on September 15, 2008, though the station was not completed until 2009. Orient Heights was closed from March 23 to November 26, 2013, for a complete reconstruction.  closed from March 22, 2014, to March 21, 2016, for a complete renovation and accessibility modifications.

Service between Bowdoin and Airport was replaced by buses from May 18–31, 2020, and April 25 to May 17, 2022, for track replacement and waterproofing work in the East Boston Tunnel. During the 2022 closure, temporary ferry service between Long Wharf and East Boston was also offered. An additional closure of the outer portion of the line from May 22 to June 8, 2022, will allow for repairs to the Suffolk Downs footbridge.

Proposed expansions

Extension to Lynn

There is a proposal to extend the Blue Line northward to Lynn, Massachusetts. The land to extend the line was purchased for the initial construction of the Revere Extension, but due to budgetary constraints Wonderland station was designated the northern terminus. Two potential extension routes have been identified. One proposed path would run through marshland alongside the existing Newburyport/Rockport commuter rail line, on rail lines formerly operated by the Boston and Maine Railroad. An alternative route would extend the line alongside Revere Beach Boulevard through Point of Pines and the Lynnway, along the remainder of the BRB&L right of way. Other alternatives include increased commuter rail or bus service, or connecting the Blue Line to a commuter rail stop near Wonderland via a short connector.

The Blue Line extension has been proposed in various forms for over 80 years. The 1926 Report on Improved Transportation Facilities and 1945–47 Coolidge Commission Report recommended that the East Boston Tunnel line, which had been converted to rapid transit from streetcars in 1924, be extended to Lynn via the Boston, Revere Beach & Lynn right-of-way. Ever since the 1954 Revere extension was cut short to Wonderland, a further extension to Lynn has been planned. Following on the 1926 and 1945-47 studies, the 1966 Program for Mass Transportation recommended that the Blue Line be extended to Lynn, while the 1969 Recommended Highway and Transit Plan proposed that the extension run as far as Salem. An extension was not present in the 1972 Final Report of the Boston Transportation Planning Review, but the 1974 Transportation Plan revived the project with possible termini of Lynn, Salem, or even Route 128 in Peabody. The 1978 Program for Mass Transportation report and 1983 Transportation Plan both continued support for an extension to Lynn. Despite the continued recommendations, however, other projects like extensions of the Red and Orange lines were given funding instead of the Blue Line.

In 2005, Lieutenant Governor Kerry Healy estimated construction would begin in 2017.  Authorization to bond for planning money for the project was included in an April 2008 state bond bill, and $25 million in federal earmarks have been obtained. A 2004 state bond bill authorized $246.5 million on the condition of finding 50% non-state matching funds (which presumably would come from the federal government). The Draft Environmental Impact Report was expected to be complete by the end of 2008, but has been delayed as planners focus on meeting the legal deadline for the Green Line extension to Somerville and Medford.

Red Line–Blue Line connector
The Blue Line and Red Line are currently the only MBTA subway rail lines without a direct transfer to each other; passengers must ride one stop on the Green or Orange lines to transfer.

An extension of the East Boston Tunnel to Charles Street was considered in a 1924 study of Charles station. A 1926 proposal to convert the Tremont Street subway and connecting streetcar lines into a pair of rapid transit trunk lines called for the East Boston Tunnel to be extended south to Park Street station, with through service running between Maverick Square and Brighton using the Commonwealth Avenue line. (Three potential alignment were considered: one running south from Bowdoin, and two running southwest from a relocated Scollay Under.) Regional transportation plans from the 1940s to the early 1970s focused on suburban extensions, with no downtown extension past Bowdoin. 

The rise of Kendall Square as a major employment center, the coming of the Red Line Northwest Extension, and increased traffic to Logan Airport created demand in the 1970s for a direct connection between the Red and Blue lines. A 1974 state plan again proposed an extension to Park Street, while the 1978 and 1983 Program for Mass Transportation updates called for an extension to Charles/MGH instead. A 1986 MBTA feasibility study for a Charles/MGH extension called for a cut-and-cover tunnel beginning west of Bowdoin Street with no changes to Bowdoin station. The project was then estimated to cost $79–95 million (equivalent to $– million in ). A 1987 cost-effectiveness study estimated 9,030 daily one-way trips over the extension.

In 1991, the state agreed to built a set of transit projects as part of the settlement of a lawsuit by the Conservation Law Foundation (CLF) over auto emissions from the Big Dig project. Among these projects was A Red Line–Blue Line connector, to be complete by the end of 2011. The 2003–07 reconstruction of Charles/MGH station was designed to accommodate a future Blue Line platform. In 2005, the state replaced the connector with other projects providing equivalent air quality improvements. After a second lawsuit from the CLF, the state agreed in 2006 to complete design of the connector. An Expanded Environmental Notification Form was released in September 2007

The 2010 Draft Environmental Impact Report (DEIR) instead called for a pair of deeper tunnels bored by a tunnel boring machine (TBM), starting east of Bowdoin station and passing underneath the existing platform. Keeping the existing station and loop was judged infeasible because evacuation from a disabled train would not be possible in the confined loop, and the eastbound platform is not long enough for six-car trains. Use of a TBM rather than cut-and-cover construction was intended to reduce construction cost and limit disruption on Cambridge Street. Alternatives with a replacement Bowdoin station west of Bowdoin Street, and without a replacement station, were considered; the latter was recommended due to lower cost and reduced travel time. The preferred alternative was estimated to cost $748 million and take six years to construct. Daily ridership was estimated to be 18,940 one-way trips in 2030.

Lacking available funding for construction, the MBTA did not complete design of the extension. The possibility of a public-private partnership (P3) to advance the project was studied in 2013. In 2015, the EPA removed the requirement for the MBTA to complete design. In 2018, the state commissioned a $50,000 study to reevaluate tunneling costs; it found that contrary to the 2010 DEIR, cut-and-cover tunneling could be considerably less costly than a TBM, albeit with more surface disruption. Cut-and-cover was estimated to cost $200–250 million for the tunnel costs alone, compared to $300–350 million for TBM and the $413 million estimated in the DEIR. In April 2019, the MBTA indicated plans to spend $15 million to design the connector in a five-year spending plan.

A conceptual design completed in 2020 called for cut-and-cover construction, with Bowdoin station still planned for closure. The new Blue Line level at Charles/MGH would have entrances from the existing lobby and a new headhouse in an MGH development on the north side of Charles Street. Total project cost was estimated as $850 million ($740 million for construction including 30% contingency, $50 million for design, $30 million in administration costs, and $30 million for additional rolling stock), with construction lasting from 2025 to 2030.

Previous connection
A physical rail connection between the Red and Blue Lines existed in the early part of the 20th century (prior to the MBTA assigning the color designations of the subway lines). Railcars from what is today the Blue Line could emerge from a ramp portal surfacing between Joy Street and Russell Street, just beyond Bowdoin station. The railcars would run on former streetcar track down Cambridge Street and then most of the distance to the western end of the Longfellow Bridge, connecting to what is now the Red Line just east of its Cambridge subway portal, near what is now Kendall/MIT station. Because the tracks were unpowered, individual cars had to be towed along the street at night. This connection was never used in passenger service, but was used to transport Blue Line cars to the Eliot Street Yard maintenance shops then located near Harvard Square station. When the Blue Line eventually got its own maintenance shops, the connection was removed and the ramp portal was permanently covered in 1952.

Station listing

Rolling stock

Current 
Like the Orange Line and Red Line, the Blue Line tracks are standard-gauge heavy rail. Uniquely among MBTA rolling stock, Blue Line cars use both third rail power and pantograph current pickup from overhead catenary wires. The overhead pantograph was implemented to avoid third rail icing that frequently occurs in winter. Third rail power is used in the original Blue Line tunnels, which are smaller than most modern subway tunnels. Trains switch between the two modes at Airport station, near where the line transitions between running in a tunnel and running above ground. Previously, the switchover was made underground at Maverick station.

The MBTA awarded the $174 million construction contract for the 94 cars in November 2001, with a total program cost of $200 million. The first deliveries were scheduled for January 2004, but ultimately delayed to 2007 due to manufacturing issues. The first set entered revenue service on February 20, 2008. The first three six-car trains began operating on September 15, 2008; by February 2009, eight of thirteen trainsets used at rush hour were six-car sets. By November 2009, all service was with six-car trains.

, the line operates at 4.5-minute headways at weekday peak hours, with headways ranging from 5.5 to 9 minutes at other times. Afternoon and peak service operates with 12 trains (72 cars), while other service uses 6 trains (36 cars). The MBTA expects to replace the current fleet in the mid-2030s after a 25-year operating lifespan. A 130-car fleet is planned to replace the existing 94-car fleet.

Former 
The first generation of high-floor rolling stock on the line were the No. 1 and No. 2 East Boston Rapid Transit cars, which were built by Pullman-Standard in 1923–1924 when the line was converted from streetcar operation to rapid transit. These were supplemented by the No. 3 fleet, built in 1951 by St. Louis Car Company, which was acquired for the Revere Extension. Cars in these earlier fleets were numbered in the 0500 series.

The Nos. 1–3 fleets were replaced by 70 cars in the 0600 series (No. 4 cars), built 1978-1980 by Hawker Siddeley Canada Car and Foundry of Thunder Bay, Ontario, Canada. The design was based on the PA3 model used by PATH in New Jersey. They were narrower and shorter than otherwise similar ones running on the Orange Line, due to the stations and tunnels on the Blue Line having been originally designed to accommodate streetcars. In late 2009, the Seashore Trolley Museum received retired Hawker set 622-623 for their collection. By 2011, most of the 600-series cars were retired because of severe corrosion from the salty ocean air. Several 600-series cars were retained on MBTA property but no longer usable. Parts of scrapped cars are used to maintain Orange Line 1200 series rolling stock, which were built at the same time by Hawker Siddeley and used many of the same components. In 2012, set 616-617 was placed in the former Broadway streetcar tunnel for use in emergency training.

References

External links

MBTA - Blue Line (official site)
MBTA – Red Blue Connector
Red-Blue Connector documents
Blue Line at world.nycsubway.org

 
Standard gauge railways in the United States
Tunnels completed in 1904
Airport rail links in the United States
600 V DC railway electrification
Transportation in Suffolk County, Massachusetts